Marketing effectiveness is the measure of how effective a given marketer's go to market strategy is toward meeting the goal of maximizing their spending to achieve positive results in both the short- and long-term. It is also related to marketing ROI and return on marketing investment (ROMI).

Marketing expert Tony Lennon believes marketing effectiveness is quintessential to marketing, going so far as to say It's not marketing if it's not measured.

History 
The concept of marketing effectiveness first came to prominence in the 1990s with the publication of Robert Shaw's Improving Marketing Effectiveness  which won the 1998 Business Management Book of the Year Award.

In the book What Sticks, authors Rex Briggs and Greg Stuart calculated that marketers waste 37% of their marketing investment. Reasons for the waste include failure to understand underlying customer motivations for buying, ineffective messages, and inefficient media mix investment (pg 19–20).

What Sticks was named the #1 Book in Marketing by Ad Age and is required reading at leading universities including the Wharton School of the University of Pennsylvania and Harvard, suggesting that the Marketing Effectiveness continues to be an important business topic.

A preferred marketing effectiveness analysis is marketing mix modeling.

Factors driving marketing effectiveness

 Corporate: Each company operates within different bounds. These are determined by their size, their budget and their ability to make organizes act in similar ways leading to the need to segment them. Based on these segments, they make choices based on how they value the attributes of a product and the brand, in return for price paid for the product. Consumers build brand value through information. Information is received through many sources, such as, advertising, word-of-mouth and in the (distribution) channel often characterized with the purchase funnel, a McKinsey & Company concept. Lastly, consumers consume and make purchase decisions in certain ways.
 Exogenous Factors: External factors such as weather, interest rates, government regulations, etc. that lie outside of marketers' immediate control and may impact marketing effectiveness. Understanding the impact these factors have on consumers can help in designing programs that take advantage or mitigate the risk of these factors and the impact they may have on a marketing campaigns.  Therefore, exogenous factors often influence how marketers strive to improve their results such as leveraging the factors noted above (i.e. seasonality, interest rates, regulatory environment) in an effort to improve marketing effectiveness.
 Marketing Strategy: Improving marketing effectiveness can be achieved by employing a superior marketing strategy. By positioning the product or brand correctly, the product/brand will be more successful in the market than competitors’ products/brands. The match-up between the product, the consumer lifestyle, and the endorser is important for effectiveness of brand communication. Even with the best strategy, marketers must execute their programs properly to achieve extraordinary results.
 Marketing Creative: Even without a change in strategy, better creatives can improve results. Without a change in strategy, AFLAC was able to achieve stunning results with its introduction of the Duck (AFLAC) campaign. With the introduction of this new creative concept, the company growth rate soared from 12% prior to the campaign to 28% following it. (See references below, Bang). Creatives are an integral part of any marketing campaign, as it establishes the corporate identity and plays a significant role in brand recollection. These may include designing point of purchase displays, brochures or even product packaging. Apart from communicating the brand, consistency in design across various mediums helps reinforce a specific offering in the minds of the audience. Using typography, imagery and color, marketing creatives evoke emotion related to a brand.
 Marketing Execution: By improving how marketers go to market, they can achieve significantly greater results without changing their strategy or their creative execution. At the marketing mix level, marketers can improve their execution by making small changes in any or all of the 4-Ps (Product, Price, Place and Promotion) (Marketing) without making changes to the strategic position or the creative execution marketers can improve their effectiveness and deliver increased revenue. At the program level, marketers can improve their effectiveness by managing and executing each of their marketing campaigns better. It is commonly known that consistency of a Marketing Creative strategy across various media (e.g. TV, Radio, Print and Online), not just within each individual media message, can amplify and enhance the impact of the overall marketing campaign effort. Additional examples would be improving direct mail through a better call-to-action or editing web site content to improve its organic search results, marketers can improve their marketing effectiveness for each type of program. A growing area of interest within (Marketing Strategy) and Execution are the more recent interaction dynamics of traditional marketing (e.g. TV or Events) with online consumer activity (e.g. Social Media). (See references below, Brand Ecosystems) Not only direct product experience, but also any stimulus provided by traditional marketing, can become a catalyst for a consumer brand "groundswell" online as outlined in the book Groundswell.
 Marketing Infrastructure (also known as Marketing Management): Improving the business of marketing can lead to significant gains for the company. Management of agencies, budgeting, motivation and coordination of marketing activities can lead to improved competitiveness and improved results. The overall accountability for brand leadership and business results is often reflected in an organization under a title within a (Brand management) department.

See also
 Marketing engineering
 Media intelligence

References

Further reading 
 Ambler, Tim, Marketing and the Bottom Line (2004) FT Press. 
 American Productivity & Quality Center, Maximizing Marketing ROI (2001) American Productivity Center. 
 Aspatore Books Staff, Improving Marketing ROI: Leading CMOs on Adding Value, Calculating Return on Investments, and Creating a Financial Impact (2006) Aspatore Books. 
 Briggs, Rex, Stuart, Greg, What Sticks: Why Most Advertising Fails and How to Guarantee Yours Succeeds (2006) Kaplan Business. 
 Farris, Paul W., Bendle, Neil T., Pfeifer, Phillip E. and Reibstein, David J., Marketing Metrics: 50+ Metrics Every Executive Should Master (2006) Wharton School Publishing. 
 Kotler, Philip.; Kevin Lane Keller (2006). Marketing Management, 12th ed.. Pearson Prentice Hall. .
 Laermer, Richard; Simmons, Mark, Punk Marketing, New York : HarperCollins, 2007.  (Review of the book by Marilyn Scrizzi, in Journal of Consumer Marketing 24(7), 2007)
 Lenskold, James, Marketing ROI: The Path to Campaign, Customer, and Corporate Profitability (2003) McGraw-Hill. 
 Li, Charlene & Bernoff, Josh Groundswell (2008)
 Lilien, Gary L., Rangaswamy, Arvind, Marketing Engineering (2004) Trafford Publishing. 
 Mann, Don, Brand Ecosystems, the relative harmony among all marketing elements that support brands (2008)
 Powell, Guy R., Return on Marketing Investment: Demand More From Your Marketing And Sales Investments (2003) RPI Press. 
 Schultz, Don E., Measuring Brand Communication ROI (1997) Assn of Natl Advertisers. 
 Thaler, Linda Kaplan, Koval, Robin, Marshall, Delia, Bang! Getting Your Message Heard in A Noisy World (2003) Doubleday Publishing. 
 Marketing Mix: The Formula to Bind a Marketing Campaign!

Marketing analytics
Customer relationship management